Erie was believed to have been an Iroquoian language spoken by the Erie people, similar to Wyandot. But it was poorly documented, and linguists are not certain that this conclusion is correct. There have been few connections with Europeans and the Erie's with the French, and Dutch being peaceful, while the English being mostly hostile.

The names Erie and Eriez are shortened forms of Erielhonan, meaning "long tail", referring to local panthers. The Erie were called the "Cat people" (Nation du Chat in French; Hodge 1910, Swanton).

At least one loanword survives from the Erie language: Chautauqua, a word of uncertain definition/translation.

Translation of words
Erielhonan (Long Tail)
Ronnongwetonwanca (Good Luck)
Kahqua/Kahkwa (Iriquois)
Gùkulëáwo (Wolf)
Chautauqua (A bag tied in the center/middle) or (Two moccasins tied together)

Uncertain Alphabet
Aa Áá Cc CHch Ee Ëë Gg Hh Ii Kk Ll Nn Oo Qq Rr Tt Uu Úú Ww Yy

References

Northern Iroquoian languages
Extinct languages of North America
Languages extinct in the 17th century
Chautauqua County, New York
Indigenous languages of Pennsylvania